A Water Authority may refer to :
 A Water board
 One of 12 Regional water authorities operational in England and Wales between 1974 and 1985.